NNU may refer to:

Northwest Nazarene University
National Nurses United
Nanjing Normal University
Nanning Normal University